Ricardo Alves Almeida (born November 29, 1976) is a Brazilian-American former mixed martial artist and current Brazilian Jiu-Jitsu grappler residing in Bordentown, New Jersey. Almeida is a veteran of the Ultimate Fighting Championship, PRIDE Fighting Championships, Grapplers Quest, and a former Middleweight King of Pancrase. In Pancrase he had notable wins over Nate Marquardt and Kazuo Misaki. Almeida trains with and teaches former UFC Lightweight Champion Frankie Edgar at his longtime Gracie system gym in Robbinsville, NJ. He also trains former UFC Lightweight champion Eddie Alvarez and The Ultimate Fighter 19 winner Corey Anderson

Background
Almeida is a fourth degree black belt in Brazilian Jiu-Jitsu under Renzo Gracie, and part of the Gracie Barra combat and competition team.

Mixed martial arts career

PRIDE
Almeida made his professional MMA debut on December 9, 2000 at PRIDE 12 against Akira Shoji. Almeida won his debut fight via unanimous decision.

Almeida made a one-off return to PRIDE on May 23, 2004 against Ryo Chonan at Pride:Bushido 3. Almeida won via unanimous decision.

UFC
Almeida made his UFC debut on May 4, 2001 at UFC 31 against Matt Lindland in a light heavyweight match. Referee Mario Yamasaki ended the fight in the third round after repeated illegal upkicks from Almeida, giving him a loss via disqualification.

His next fight was against Eugene Jackson on September 28, 2001 at UFC 33 in his middleweight debut. Almeida won the fight via triangle choke in the first round.

His next fight would be his last with the UFC for 6 years, fighting Andrei Semenov at UFC 35 on January 11, 2002. Almeida lost the fight via TKO in the second round after Semenov landed hard punches in his UFC debut.

Almeida left the UFC in 2002 for Pancrase.

Pancrase
In his Pancrase debut, Almeida fought Osami Shibuya on November 30, 2002 at Pancrase: Spirit 8. He won the fight via rear naked choke in the first round.

His next fight was against Ikuhisa Minowa on February 16, 2003 at Pancrase: Hybrid 2. He won the fight via unanimous decision.

His next fight was against Yuki Sasaki on April 12, 2003 at Pancrase: Hybrid 4. He won the fight via unanimous decision.

His next fight was against Kazuo Misaki on August 31, 2003 at Pancrase: 10th Anniversary Show. He won the fight via majority decision.

After winning 4 fights in a row with Pancrase, Almeida was booked for a title fight against Nate Marquardt to become the next Middleweight King Of Pancrase. They fought on November 30, 2003 at Pancrase: Hybrid 10. Almeida tackled Marquardt and was able to lock in a guillotine choke and submit Marquardt in the first round, becoming the new Middleweight King Of Pancrase. Controversy began after Almeida did not release the choke for a few seconds after Marquardt tapped and the referee stepped in. This frustrated Marquardt which caused him to throw a punch at Almeida. Almeida's cornermen intervened in the conflict, with Renzo Gracie kicking Marquardt in the face. Both men reconciled and apologised shortly after the incident. 

He vacated the title in July 2004 and announced his retirement.

Hiatus
Almeida retired for a four-year period after a six-fight win streak to focus on running his Jiu-Jitsu school in Hamilton Township, Mercer County, New Jersey.

Return to UFC
Almeida came out of retirement and returned to the UFC in 2008.

His return bout in the UFC occurred at UFC 81, where he won by submitting Rob Yundt via guillotine choke at 1:08 in the first round.

Almeida's next fight was against top fighter Patrick Cote at UFC 86, where he lost a close split decision.

Almeida returned at UFC Fight Night: Condit vs. Kampmann, this time on the preliminary card, to face Matt Horwich, winning by unanimous decision.

His next fight took place on August 8 in Philadelphia against Kendall Grove at UFC 101. Almeida won by outgrappling his opponent for the majority of the bout and controlling the fight to earn a unanimous decision victory.

He was scheduled to fight Jon Fitch at UFC 106 but had to withdraw due to a knee injury suffered while training.

Almeida faced Matt Brown on March 27, 2010, at UFC 111 in his welterweight debut. Almeida defeated Brown by rear naked choke at 2:30 in round 2.

Almeida faced former UFC Welterweight Champion and UFC Hall of Famer Matt Hughes on August 7, 2010, at UFC 117 and lost via technical submission due to a Dave Schultz front headlock.

Almeida  faced T. J. Grant on December 11, 2010, at UFC 124. Almeida defeated Grant by unanimous decision.

Almeida faced Mike Pyle on March 19, 2011, at UFC 128. He lost the fight via unanimous decision.

Retirement
Almeida retired for the second time on March 30, 2011, saying that he could not focus 100 percent on fighting, citing his family, his son (who was diagnosed with autism), and teaching at his academies as other areas of his life that needed attention. He added that he would continue to support the UFC and teammates such as Frankie Edgar, Kris McCray, Eddie Alvarez, and Corey Anderson.

MMA Judge
A week after his retirement, Almeida became a professional MMA judge in New Jersey. On May 5, 2012, he made his major-event debut as a judge at the UFC on FOX 3 card at the Izod Center at the Meadowlands Sports Complex.

Personal life
Ricardo resides between Robbinsville, NJ and Sarasota, FL with his family. He is the head instructor and owner at Ricardo Almeida Brazilian jiu-jitsu School located in Robbinsville Township, New Jersey and in Lakewood Ranch, FL.

Grappling credentials
ADCC Submission Wrestling World Championship

ADCC 2003
88–98 kg: 4th place

ADCC 2001
88–98 kg: 2nd place
Openweight: 4th place

ADCC 2000
Openweight: 3rd place

ADCC 1999
88–98 kg: 3rd place

ADCC 1998
88–98 kg: 2nd place

CBJJ Pan American Championships

1999
Brown Belt pesado: 1st Place

CBJJ Brazilian Championships

1997
Brown Belt Pesado: 1st Place

1996
Purple Belt Médio: 1st Place
Purple Belt Open Weight: 3rd Place

IBJJF Pan American No-Gi Championship

2012
Black belt Meio-Pesado: 1st Place

IBJJF  No-Gi Worlds Championship

2013
Black Belt Masters: 1st Place

Mixed martial arts record

|-
| Loss
| align=center| 13–5
| Mike Pyle
| Decision (unanimous)
| UFC 128
| 
| align=center| 3
| align=center| 5:00
| Newark, New Jersey, United States
| 
|-
| Win
| align=center| 13–4
| T. J. Grant
| Decision (unanimous)
| UFC 124
| 
| align=center| 3
| align=center| 5:00
| Montreal, Quebec, Canada
| 
|-
| Loss
| align=center| 12–4
| Matt Hughes
| Technical Submission (Dave Schultz front headlock)
| UFC 117
| 
| align=center| 1
| align=center| 3:15
| Oakland, California, United States
| 
|-
| Win
| align=center| 12–3
| Matt Brown
| Submission (rear-naked choke)
| UFC 111
| 
| align=center| 2
| align=center| 3:30
| Newark, New Jersey, United States
| 
|-
| Win
| align=center| 11–3
| Kendall Grove
| Decision (unanimous)
| UFC 101
| 
| align=center| 3
| align=center| 5:00
| Philadelphia, Pennsylvania, United States
| 
|-
| Win
| align=center| 10–3
| Matt Horwich
| Decision (unanimous)
| UFC Fight Night: Condit vs. Kampmann
| 
| align=center| 3
| align=center| 5:00
| Nashville, Tennessee, United States
| 
|-
| Loss
| align=center| 9–3
| Patrick Côté
| Decision (split)
| UFC 86
| 
| align=center| 3
| align=center| 5:00
| Las Vegas, Nevada, United States
| 
|-
| Win
| align=center| 9–2
| Rob Yundt
| Submission (guillotine choke)
| UFC 81
| 
| align=center| 1
| align=center| 1:08
| Las Vegas, Nevada, United States
| 
|-
| Win
| align=center| 8–2
| Ryo Chonan
| Decision (unanimous)
| Pride Bushido 3
| 
| align=center| 2
| align=center| 5:00
| Yokohama, Japan
| 
|-
| Win
| align=center| 7–2
| Nate Marquardt
| Submission (guillotine choke)
| Pancrase - Hybrid 10
| 
| align=center| 1
| align=center| 4:53
| Tokyo, Japan
| 
|-
| Win
| align=center| 6–2
| Kazuo Misaki
| Decision (majority)
| Pancrase - 10th Anniversary Show
| 
| align=center| 3
| align=center| 5:00
| Tokyo, Japan
| 
|-
| Win
| align=center| 5–2
| Yuki Sasaki
| Decision (unanimous)
| Pancrase - Hybrid 4
| 
| align=center| 3
| align=center| 5:00
| Tokyo, Japan
| 
|-
| Win
| align=center| 4–2
| Ikuhisa Minowa
| Decision (unanimous)
| Pancrase - Hybrid 2
| 
| align=center| 3
| align=center| 5:00
| Osaka, Japan
| 
|-
| Win
| align=center| 3–2
| Osami Shibuya
| Submission (rear-naked choke)
| Pancrase - Spirit 8
| 
| align=center| 1
| align=center| 3:25
| Yokohama, Japan
| 
|-
| Loss
| align=center| 2–2
| Andrei Semenov
| TKO (punches)
| UFC 35
| 
| align=center| 2
| align=center| 2:01
| Uncasville, Connecticut, United States
| 
|-
| Win
| align=center| 2–1
| Eugene Jackson
| Submission (triangle choke)
| UFC 33
| 
| align=center| 1
| align=center| 4:06
| Las Vegas, Nevada, United States
| 
|-
| Loss
| align=center| 1–1
| Matt Lindland
| DQ (repeated fouls)
| UFC 31
| 
| align=center| 3
| align=center| 4:21
| Atlantic City, New Jersey, United States
| 
|-
| Win
| align=center| 1–0
| Akira Shoji
| Decision (unanimous)
| Pride 12 - Cold Fury
| 
| align=center| 2
| align=center| 5:00
| Saitama, Japan
| 
|}

References

External links
 Ricardo Almeida Brazilian Jiu-Jitsu Academy
 
 
 Ricardo Almeida, Pancrase profile

Living people
1976 births
Sportspeople from New York City
People from Weehawken, New Jersey
People from Bordentown, New Jersey
American sportspeople of Brazilian descent
American practitioners of Brazilian jiu-jitsu
American male mixed martial artists
Welterweight mixed martial artists
Mixed martial artists utilizing Brazilian jiu-jitsu
Mixed martial artists from New Jersey
Sportspeople from Burlington County, New Jersey
People awarded a black belt in Brazilian jiu-jitsu
Ultimate Fighting Championship male fighters